Adrian Fisher is an English football manager who worked as head coach of the Seychelles national football team.

Career
Fisher started his managerial career with the Seychelles national football team, a position he held until 1973.

References 

Living people
Seychelles national football team managers
English football managers
Year of birth missing (living people)